Ellen Weiss (born January 30, 1959) is an American journalist and four-time Peabody Award winner. She joined National Public Radio (NPR) in 1982, eventually running the NPR News national desk and serving as executive producer of the NPR News magazine All Things Considered. She was named NPR vice president for news in April 2007 and held that post until January 2011.   She was executive editor at the nonprofit Center for Public Integrity and since 2013 has been the Washington DC Bureau Chief and Vice-President for the E.W. Scripps Company. In 2015, she won her fourth Peabody Award for a story about soldiers discharged from the military for sexual crimes who evade registering as sex offenders after leaving the military.

She attended Scarsdale High School in Scarsdale, New York, and is a Smith College graduate. She currently resides in Washington, D.C. with her husband, Rabbi David Saperstein. They are the parents of musician Daniel Saperstein.

References

Living people
1959 births
American radio executives
People from Scarsdale, New York
Smith College alumni
NPR personalities
Peabody Award winners
American women journalists
Scarsdale High School alumni
21st-century American women